The Chatham Record is a weekly newspaper based in Pittsboro, North Carolina and serving Chatham County, North Carolina.

Started in 1878, The Chatham Record has been family-owned for nearly 80 years. E.A. Resch bought the newspaper along with The Chatham News of Siler City in 1939.  On October 25, 2018 The Chatham News announced that The Chatham News Publishing Company, Inc. had sold the newspapers to The Chatham Media Group LLC. The group included former Sanford Herald publisher Bill Horner III, Kirk Bradley, and Chris Ehrenfeld. Bradley and Ehrenfeld cared about the papers being locally owned.

See also
 List of newspapers published in North Carolina

References

External links

Weekly newspapers published in North Carolina
Chatham County, North Carolina
1878 establishments in North Carolina
Publications established in 1878